The Otoe–Missouria Tribe of Indians is a federally recognized  tribe, located in Oklahoma. The tribe is made up of Otoe and Missouria peoples. Their language, the Chiwere language, is part of the Siouan language family.

History
The Otoe and Missouria tribes both originated in Wisconsin in the Great Lakes region. They had once been a single tribe that included the ancestors of the Ho-Chunk, Winnebago and Iowa tribes. In the 16th century, the Iowa, Otoe, and Missouria broke away and moved to the south and west. By the late 17th century, the Missouria had settled near the Missouri and Grand rivers in what became Missouri.

Meanwhile, the Otoe settled along what is now the Iowa–Minnesota border. They first came into contact with Europeans in late 17th century. Jacques Marquette, the French explorer, included them on a 1673 map, placing the Otoe near the Des Moines and upper Iowa rivers. In 1700, Pierre Le Moyne d'Iberville wrote that the Otoe and the Iowa lived with the Omaha tribe in territory to the west of the Mississippi and Missouri rivers. After contact and continued pressure by European-Americans, they migrated to the territory of later Nebraska, settling near the Platte River. This area was later set aside for them as the Otoe Reservation.

During the 18th century the Missouria people suffered from epidemics of new infectious diseases, especially smallpox, which killed many in the tribe. They also lost people to frequent warfare with enemies, such as the Sac and Fox. In 1796, some surviving Missouria joined the Osage and Kaw tribes, while 80 Missouria joined the Otoe.

In the 19th century, the Missouria and the Otoe established permanent villages consisting primarily of earth lodges, but also occasionally tipis and bark lodges. Their joined society was patrilineal and comprised seven to ten clans, each with distinct assigned responsibilities. Tribal members had exogamous marriage practices; young people had to marry outside their clan. Each clan had a leader, and together the clan chiefs formed a tribal council. By tradition, the chief of the Bear Clan was the principal leader of the tribes. The men hunted buffalo. The women processed meat and used hides, bone, horn, and other the parts of the animals for tools, clothing, etc. In addition, they cultivated and processed such crops as squash, beans, corn, and pumpkins.

In 1804, the Lewis and Clark Expedition estimated their population to be 500. Artist George Catlin, who also traveled in their territory in 1833, estimated their population at 1,200. In 1830 there were an estimated 1500 Otoe–Missouria living together as a group. By 1886, only 334 Otoe–Missouria survived.

The first land cession treaty between the Otoe–Missouria and the United States was in 1830. More treaties followed in 1833, 1836, and 1854. The 1854 Treaty established a reservation on the Kansas-Nebraska border, near the Big Blue River. The tribe split in factions between assimilationists and traditionalists. Quaker missionaries influenced the assimilationist Otoe–Missouria faction, who became known as the Quaker Band. The traditionalists were known as the Coyote Band.

It sold the rest in 1881, when Congress forced the Otoe–Missouria into Indian Territory. The Coyote Band settled on the Sac and Fox reservation, while the Quaker Band settled on their own small,  reservation in present-day Noble and Pawnee counties.

The Coyote Band rejoined the Quaker Band. But under the Dawes Act, in the 1890s, their communal holdings of the reservation were distributed as allotments to individual heads of households. The US declared as surplus any land remaining after allotment, and allowed non-Native Americans to buy it. A total of 514 Otoe–Missourias received individual allotments. In the mid-20th century the Otoe–Missouria people filed a claim for compensation for their lands lost during the 19th century; their claim was upheld by the Indian Claims Commission and they were paid a settlement in the 1960s.

The tribe ratified its constitution in 1984 in accordance with the Oklahoma Indian Welfare Act.

In 2009, the Environmental Protection Agency awarded $125,000 to the tribe for water quality program.

In 2020, the tribe received a grant from the U.S. Department of Housing and Urban Development as part of their Indian Community Development Block Grant Imminent Threat program.

Government
The Otoe–Missouria Tribe of Indians is headquartered in Red Rock, Oklahoma, and their tribal jurisdictional area is in Noble and Kay counties. In 2011, they had 3,089 enrolled tribal members, with the majority living within the state of Oklahoma.

The Tribal Council is the elected governing body of the Otoe–Missouria Tribe. The primary duties of the Tribal Council are to enforce the Tribal laws and policies and to serve as the decision-making authority on budgets and investments.  The Tribal Council is also the parent body for the Tribal Administration. Overall, the Tribal Administration ensures that services, as decided by the Tribal Council, are provided to Tribal Members.

The Tribal Council consists of seven members elected by secret ballot by qualified voters of the Tribe. The terms for each member are staggered and last for three years.  There are no term limits. Each Tribal Council member has responsibilities for certain duties, as listed in the Otoe–Missouria Tribe of Indians Constitution.

The Council holds regular meetings monthly in a place and date determined by the members. Currently the meetings are held in the Council Building at tribal headquarters. And are open to the public, except when the Council is in Executive Session.

The tribe's chairman is John R. Shotton, currently serving a three-year term. Shotton has the distinction of being the youngest person to ever serve on the tribal council, being first elected when he was 29 years old.

Economic development
The tribe operates its own housing authority and issues tribal vehicle tags. They own two gas stations, two smoke shops, two financial services companies, and five casinos. The estimated annual economic impact of the Otoe–Missouria Tribe is $156.30 million. The Otoe–Missouria casinos are 7 Clans Paradise Casino in Red Rock; First Council Casino in Newkirk, and Lil' Bit of Paradise Casino—Chilocco, also in Newkirk; and Lil' Bit of Paradise Casino—Red Rock, in Red Rock. A new casino was opened in May 2016 in Perry, Oklahoma. The tribe also jointly operates a wind farm along with other tribes.

In 2010, the tribe partnered with MacFarlane Group to create a tribal lender, named American Web Loan. The chair of the tribe, John Shotton, has said the company was an important financial asset for the tribe. In October 2016, the tribe acquired the MacFarlane Group for $200 million. Through this partnership, the tribe received around one percent of the revenue as a royalty payment. 

In July 2020, the United States Court of Appeals for the Third Circuit found that the tribe's payday lender could not compel arbitration to defeat a Racketeer Influenced and Corrupt Organizations Act lawsuit brought by borrowers because the choice of law clause in the loans had adopted only the tribe's own law. The company settled the class action lawsuit in 2021, which had alleged illegal predatory lending for $182 million, including $86 million in cash and $76 million in loan cancellation.

On May 20, 2019, the NCUA presented a federal credit union charter to the Otoe-Missouria Federal Credit Union in Red Rock, Oklahoma. The Otoe-Missouria Federal Credit Union will serve approximately 4,200 members and employees of the Otoe-Missouria Tribe.

The Taylor Policy Group concluded that the tribe's efforts to diversify its economy resulted in a massive economic impact to Oklahoma and surrounding areas, including over $45 million in direct compensation to employees across the Tribe's various enterprises.

Language and culture
At most three tribal members still speak the Otoe or Chiwere language; however, the tribe has a program to revitalize the language. Language classes are held weekly in Edmond, Oklahoma.

For almost century and a half, since 1881, an annual Otoe–Missouria Encampment is held every third weekend in July near Red Rock, Oklahoma.

The Otoe-Missouria tribe's history is well represented at the First Americans Museum in Oklahoma city, several tribal members worked with the museum in order to make sure their culture was accurately represented.

Education
In August 2019, the tribe was among several that chartered Bacone College in Muskogee, Oklahoma as a tribal college.

The tribes took over control of the college in order to secure federal funding, get it on a stable footing after it ran into financial difficulties, and be able to control its curriculum to serve the needs of their students. It had originally been established in the 19th century in affiliation with the Baptist Church to serve Native American students.

Gallery

Notable Otoe–Missouria people
 Annette Arkeketa, author
 Benjamin Arkeketa (1928–2002), painter
 Johny Hendricks, former UFC fighter.
 Anna Lee Walters (b. 1946), author and publisher
 Truman Washington Dailey (1898–1996), fluent language speaker, traditionalist

Notes

External links

 Website of the Otoe–Missouria Tribe of Indians
 Constitution of the Otoe–Missouria Tribe of Indians
 Otoe–Missouria, Oklahoma Historical Society's Encyclopedia of Oklahoma History and Culture

 
Native American tribes in Oklahoma
Federally recognized tribes in the United States